Trysimia albomaculata is a species of beetle in the family Cerambycidae. It was described by Bernhard Schwarzer  in 1924. It is known from Sumatra.

References

Lamiini
Beetles described in 1924